Chasing The Devil: Temptation is the fourth studio album by American rapper Krayzie Bone, released on November 20, 2015, under RBC Records.

Background
Krayzie Bone had been working on his fourth album for nearly 8 years, making it the longest time he has ever spent making a record. The album had been delayed several times before its release. Krayzie Bone had also expressed due to the polarizing response to the album title, in an interview with HipHopDX that he "just want to let everybody know what I don’t mean, because there’s a lot of misconceptions of the title. It doesn’t mean that I’m actually chasing the devil. I’m actually talking about certain things that we pursue in life sometimes that have evil motives behind them. You can be chasing the devil if you’re a politician trying to get power. You can be chasing the devil if you’re a normal person trying to get money and fame. I’m not necessarily saying that it’s evil to chase those things, but when you do it and all you think about is being rich or being that person, that’s something totally different."

Singles
The album's lead single, titled "Cloudy", was released on November 3, 2015.

The album's second single, titled "Like Fire", was released on November 18, 2015.

Track listing
All tracks produced by Anthony Henderson.

Notes
 "Hold On To Ya Soul" features background vocals by Phaedra
 "A Wise Fool" and "So Called Friends" features additional vocals by Caine. 
 "Can't Walk Away" features additional vocals by Gabe Lopez, Thomas Fiss and Flesh-N-Bone
 "Brand New Everything" features additional vocals by Bizzy Bone
 "Ride for Me" features additional vocals by Kief Brown

Charts

References 

2015 albums
Krayzie Bone albums